Rhytidoponera kurandensis is a species of ant in the subfamily Ectatomminae.

References 

Ectatomminae
Insects described in 1958